Datuk Jimmy Choo  (born 15 November 1948) is a Malaysian fashion designer of Chinese descent based in the United Kingdom. He co-founded Jimmy Choo Ltd, which became known for its handmade women's shoes.

Early life
Choo was born in 1948 in Penang in the newly established Federation of Malaya, into a family of shoemakers. His family name is Chow, but was misspelled on his birth certificate as Choo. He studied at Penang street Primary School in Love Lane, Penang. Choo's father, a shoemaker who made all of his shoes by hand, taught him the craft. "My parents were shoemakers and I have followed my father's lead. He inspired me," said Jimmy Choo. He made his first pair of shoes when he was 11 years old, a pair of slippers.

Between 1982 and 1984, Choo studied at Cordwainers Technical College in Hackney (now part of the London College of Fashion) in London. He went to a design firm to work after graduation, wishing to remain in London instead of going back to Malaysia.

Career
After college, Choo worked at two design companies for a total of nine years before opening his own business. Choo's parents moved to Britain to help him get started, and he eventually expanded the business by opening his own shop in 1986, renting an old hospital building. His craftsmanship and designs were soon noticed at London Fashion Week in 1988. After seeing his creations, Vogue featured the shoes in an eight page spread. Choo has said that his designs became significantly more popular after the Vogue coverage. Patronage from Diana, Princess of Wales in the early 1990s further boosted his image.

In 1996, Choo co-founded Jimmy Choo Ltd with British Vogue magazine accessories editor Tamara Mellon. In April 2001, Choo sold his 50% stake in the company for £10 million. He has since concentrated his work on the exclusive Jimmy Choo couture line produced under license from Jimmy Choo Ltd. The Jimmy Choo London line, also known as Jimmy Choo Ready-To-Wear or, simply, Jimmy Choo, is under the purview of Tamara Mellon. The ready-to-wear line has expanded to include accessories such as handbags.

Personal life

Choo lives in London and is currently involved in a project to set up a shoemaking institute in Malaysia. His company continues to produce expensive high-end shoes.

He is married to Rebecca Choi from Hong Kong. The couple have two children: Emily and Danny, the creator of Smart Doll, for which his father designed shoes. A niece of the couple, Sandra Choi, followed in her uncle's footsteps by becoming a shoe designer.

He is mentioned in Fetty Wap's 2015 hit titled "Jimmy Choo", Placebo's track "Follow the cops back home", Vybz Kartel's song "Yabba Dabba Doo", the Bollywood hit song "Abhi toh Party Shuru Hui Hai" from the movie "Khubsurat" (2014), UnoTheActivist's "Ice Age" featuring Gunna (rapper), Karlae's "Jimmy Choo" featuring Young Thug and Gunna, and French Montana's 2018 hit "No Stylist", featuring Drake.

Awards and honours
 2002: Appointed an OBE (Officer of the Order of the British Empire)  in recognition of his services to the shoe and fashion industry in the UK
 2004: Awarded an honorary doctorate in art by De Montfort University, Leicester, UK, for his contribution to their unique Single Honours Footwear Design degree
 2009: Awarded an Honorary Fellowship by University of the Arts London
 2011: Winner of "The World’s Outstanding Malaysian Designer 2011" Design for Asia Award for the "Daniel" part
 2012: Received You Bring Charm to the World – the Most Influential Malaysian Award
 2013: Became a member of the Red Dot product design jury.

Honours of Malaysia
  :
  Commander of the Order of Meritorious Service (PJN) – Datuk (2013)
  :
  Knight Companion of the Order of the Crown of Pahang (DIMP) – Dato' (1999)
  :
  Officer of the Order of the Defender of State (DSPN) – Dato' (2004)

International honours
  :
  Officer of the Order of the British Empire (OBE) (2002)

References

Further reading

External links

 Jimmychoo.com
 
 Malaysia’s Résumé - Dato Jimmy Choo
 Portrait at the National Portrait Gallery
 Jimmy Choo – The Man And His Shoes

1948 births
Living people
Malaysian expatriates in the United Kingdom
Malaysian people of Hakka descent
Malaysian people of Chinese descent
British people of Chinese descent
People from Meixian District
Malaysian businesspeople
Malaysian fashion designers
Malaysian socialites
Officers of the Order of the British Empire
Commanders of the Order of Meritorious Service
People from Penang
Shoe designers
Shoemakers
British fashion designers
Eyewear brands of the United Kingdom
Alumni of the London College of Fashion